Pionersky (();) is a town in Kaliningrad Oblast, Russia, located along the Baltic Sea on the Sambian Peninsula, between Zelenogradsk and Svetlogorsk. Population figures: 

The Residence of the President of the Russian Federation "Yantar" and the only Federal Children's orthopedic sanatorium in Russia "Pionersk" are located in the town.

History

The village was first mentioned in 1254. In 1454, King Casimir IV Jagiellon incorporated the region to the Kingdom of Poland upon the request of the anti-Teutonic Prussian Confederation. After the subsequent Thirteen Years' War (1454–1466), it became a part of Poland as a fief held by the Teutonic Knights until 1525, and by secular Ducal Prussia afterwards. From 1701, it formed part of the Kingdom of Prussia, and from 1871 it was also part of Germany, then known as Neukuhren. In 1878, the village had a population of 566, mostly employed in fishing.

It was annexed by the Soviet Union in 1945 upon the end of World War II and renamed Pionersky after the children's health camp of the Young Pioneer organization of the Soviet Union that was established in the town after the war by the new Soviet authorities. The town's small harbor, formerly used only for fishing, now accommodates sailboats and beach tourism.

Administrative and municipal status
Administratively, it is incorporated as the town of oblast significance of Pionersky—an administrative unit with the status equal to that of the districts. Municipally, the town of oblast significance of Pionersky is incorporated as Pionersky Urban Okrug.

Military

International relations

Twin towns and sister cities
Pionersky is twinned with:
 Bartoszyce, Poland

Gallery

References

Notes

Sources

Cities and towns in Kaliningrad Oblast